Chaplain (Colonel) Julian Emmett Yates, USA (October 23, 1871 – May 24, 1953) was an American Army officer who served as the 3rd Chief of Chaplains of the United States Army from 1929 to 1933. Together with John B. Frazier, the Chief of Chaplains of the United States Navy, he edited The Army and Navy Hymnal (1920).

References

External links
 

1871 births
1953 deaths
United States Army officers
Burials at Arlington National Cemetery
Chiefs of Chaplains of the United States Army
Hymnal editors